Society against Serbs was a Bulgarian anti-Serb organization established in 1897 in Thessaloniki, Ottoman Empire, by Dame Gruev, a member of the Internal Macedonian Revolutionary Organization (IMRO). It had the purpose of assassinating influential Serbs in Ottoman Macedonia, consequently maintaining Bulgarian propaganda in the region.

It was established in 1897 in Thessaloniki, Ottoman Empire, on the initiative of Dame Gruev, a professor at the Bulgarian gymnasium in Thessaloniki. It was an outgrowth of the IMRO. It came as a result of the advancement of the Serb community in Macedonia. The Bulgarian propaganda was unable to suppress the Serb advancement by cultural means, nor with espionage. The opening of Serb schools in Ottoman Macedonia was met with protest demonstrations, fights, and riots organized by anti-Serb Macedonians. Serbian teachers and students of these schools were intimidated and assaulted. The organization openly called for violence against Serbs; in the Bulgarian magazine in Thessaloniki, Narodno Pravo, in the article of Bulgarian educational cause in Macedonia (българското учебното дело в Македония), it said that "the Serbs shall, with fire and sword, be evicted from Macedonia" (1897). The organization carried out assassinations of Serbs, mostly in Macedonia. The victims had crosses carved on their foreheads with knives. The first victim with a carved cross was found in a street in Thessaloniki, the professor of the Serbian gymnasium Ilija Pejčinović. The organization had up until 1902 murdered at least 43 persons, and wounded 52 persons, who were owners of Serbian schools, teachers, Serbian Orthodox clergy, and other notable Serbs in the Ottoman Empire.

References

Sources

Further reading
ШЕШУМ, Урош, 1986, Друштво против Срба 1897–1902. : методи и мере бугарске дипломатије, Егзархије и Бугарско-македонско-одринске револуционарне организације против ширења српског утицаја у Јужној Старој Србији и Македонији 1897–1902. / Урош Шешум. - Напомене и библиографске референце уз текст. - Апстракт ; Summary. У: Српске студије. - ISSN 2217-5687. - Год. 4, бр. 4 (2013), стр. 73–103. COBISS.SR-ID 203683852

Bulgarian nationalism
Persecution of Serbs
1890s establishments in Greece
1890s establishments in Bulgaria
1890s in the Ottoman Empire
1900s in the Ottoman Empire
Anti-Serbian sentiment
Serbs of North Macedonia
Internal Macedonian Revolutionary Organization
History of the Serbian Orthodox Church
Serbs from the Ottoman Empire
Kosovo vilayet
Salonica vilayet
Manastir vilayet
Organizations established in 1897
Bulgaria–Serbia relations
1897 in the Ottoman Empire